USNS Triumph (T-AGOS-4) is a  formerly of the United States Navy. She was struck from the Naval Vessel Register in 1995. On 1 October 2012 the ship was disposed of by Navy title transfer to the Maritime Administration. As of May 2015, Triumph was held as a reserve asset for spare parts for sister ships General Rudder and State of Michigan.

Stalwart class ships were originally designed to collect underwater acoustical data in support of Cold War anti-submarine warfare operations in the 1980s.

In 1998, the US Congress authorized the sale of Triumph, without the towed sonar array, to the Philippines for $11,370,000. However, the sale was not completed.

Design
The Stalwart-class ocean surveillance ships were succeeded by the longer Victorious-class ocean surveillance ships. It was powered by a diesel-electric system of four Caterpillar D-398 diesel-powered generators and two General Electric  electric motors. This produced a total of  that drove two shafts. It had a gross register tonnage of 1,584 and a deadweight tonnage of 786.

They were built to be fitted with the Surveillance Towed Array Sensor System (SURTASS) system. The ship had an endurance of thirty days. Its complement was between thirty-two and forty-seven. Its hull design was similar to that of the Powhatan-class tugboats.

References

External links

NavSource

 

Stalwart-class ocean surveillance ships
Cold War auxiliary ships of the United States
Ships built by Tacoma Boatbuilding Company
1984 ships